Featherwood Roman Camps are neighbouring archaeological sites in Northumberland, England,  north of Featherwood and about  east of Byrness. The remains of two Roman camps, near Dere Street, are scheduled monuments.

Description
The camps date from the 1st century AD. They are thought to have been used by soldiers advancing northwards, and by smaller groups employed in routine maintenance. Chew Green and Bremenium, nearby Roman encampments on Dere Street, lie to the north and south.

Featherwood East Roman Camp

Featherwood West Roman Camp
There are five gateways, the additional gateway being on the north-west side; they are defended by external earthworks.

References

Roman sites in Northumberland
Scheduled monuments in Northumberland
Archaeological sites in Northumberland
Rochester, Northumberland
Alwinton